Fahim Yasin Twaha (14 May 1968) is the 2nd and current governor of Lamu County in Kenya, out of office since 11 August 2022.

References

Living people
Year of birth missing (living people)
National Rainbow Coalition – Kenya politicians
Members of the National Assembly (Kenya)